Madascincus is a genus of skinks, lizards in the family Scincidae. The genus is endemic to Madagascar. Some taxonomic authorities place the group in the genus Amphiglossus.

Species
The following 12 species, listed alphabetically by specific name, are recognized as being valid:

Madascincus ankodabensis  – Ankodabe skink
Madascincus arenicola  
Madascincus igneocaudatus  – redtail skink
Madascincus macrolepis  – rusty skink
Madascincus melanopleura  – common Madagascar skink
Madascincus miafina  
Madascincus minutus 
Madascincus mouroundavae  – Morondava skink
Madascincus nanus  
Madascincus polleni  – Madagascar coastal skink
Madascincus pyrurus 
Madascincus stumpffi  – Stumpff's skink

Nota bene: A binomial authority in parentheses indicates that the species was originally described in a genus other than Madascincus.

References

Further reading
Brygoo E-R (1981). "Systématique des lézards scincides de la région malgache. IX. Nouvelles unités taxinomiques pour les Scelotes s.l." Bulletin du Muséum National d'Histoire Naturelle, Section A Zoologie Biologie et Écologie Animales, Série 4, 3 (4): 1193–1204. (Madascincus, new genus). (in French).

 
Lizard genera
Taxa named by Édouard-Raoul Brygoo